The 1936 Kategoria e Dytë is the fifth season of the second tier of football in Albania. The league began on 7 June and finished in August 1936 and it was divided into 3 groups, where the winner of each group qualified for the finals which was competed between 3 teams. The winners were Bardhyli Lezhë.

Group A

Bardhyli Lezhë won the group

Group B

Shkumbini Peqin won the group

Group C

Leka i Madh Permet won the group

Finals

Finals held in Durrës between 27 and 29 July 1936

References

Kategoria e Parë seasons
Albania
Albania
2